Green Actors of West Africa (GAWA) is a network of environmental organizations from West Africa created in 2005. The goal of GAWA Network is to develop ways of enhancing cooperation and coordination between and among the various donors and environmental (nature conservation) actors in this sub-African region.

The geographic coverage of GAWA network members includes: Benin, Burkina Faso, Ghana, Guinea, Ivory Coast, Liberia, Mali, Nigeria, Senegal, Sierra Leone, The Gambia, and Togo.

History
The initial concept of Green Actors in West Africa was first discussed in September 2004 during a meeting of NC-IUCN’s West African partners in Aburi, Ghana. In a later meeting in April 2005 in Cotonou, Benin, the decision was reached to formalize the network.

GAWA is thus a network of environmental non-governmental organizations (NGOs) involved in environmental protection, rehabilitation, awareness raising, biodiversity conservation and natural resource management.

Main priorities for the network 
During 2005-2006, members of the network decided to focus their efforts on:
 Advocacy, lobbying and strategic information gathering in local, national and regional contexts;
 Enhancing the technical and financial capacities of environmental NGOs to meet the challenges and threats to the natural environment, resulting from livelihood activities;
 Involvement of the local populations in biodiversity conservation and forest restoration;
 Inventories of endangered and flagship species as well as direct efforts to promote protection of protected areas;
 Environmental awareness and education at local, national and regional levels;
 Improved availability of current information on threatened species and habitats;
 Conflict management in biodiversity conservation initiatives

Funding 
The Netherlands Committee of IUCN (NC-IUCN) through the Tropical Rainforest Programme (TRP) and Dry Areas Support funds has been very instrumental in initiating the regional network. Through direct budget support to its regional focal point, the Environmental Foundation for Africa, NC-IUCN have enabled all country assessments, holding of regional network meetings and capacity building training programmes for their partners in the sub-region.

External links 
 Official website
 The Environmental Foundation for Africa (EFA)

International environmental organizations
Environmental organisations based in Sierra Leone